Alexander Grigorievich Tikhanovich (13 July 1952 – 28 January 2017) was a Soviet and Belarusian pop singer, former member of the ensemble Verasy. He was named Honored Artist and People's Artist (Belarus).

From 2006 to 2009, Alexander Tikhanovich headed the national TV music project Eurofest Belarusian selection round for the international Eurovision Song Contest.

Family
Tikhanovich's wife was singer Yadviga Poplavskaya.

References

External links

 Тиханович в смирительной рубашке рекламирует «Евровидение»
 Пока живы родители, мы остаёмся детьми (о том, как воспитали «звёздную дочь»)

1952 births
2017 deaths
Musicians from Minsk
Soviet male singers
20th-century Belarusian male singers
Recipients of the Order of Francysk Skaryna
People's Artists of Belarus
21st-century Belarusian male singers